Kallion may refer to:
Ivar Kallion (1931–2013), Estonian Communist politician and author
Kallion (Phocis), a town of ancient Greece